Liudmyla Radchenko (born 1 October 1932) is a Ukrainian athlete. She competed in the women's long jump at the 1960 Summer Olympics, representing the Soviet Union.

References

1932 births
Living people
Athletes (track and field) at the 1960 Summer Olympics
Soviet female long jumpers
Ukrainian female long jumpers
Olympic athletes of the Soviet Union
Place of birth missing (living people)